Junior Dance is a program in the Netherlands. The hosts of this program are Ewout Genemans & Kim-Lian van der Meij who have presented the Junior Eurovision Song Contest 2012 in Amsterdam.

Junior Dance 2012 finalists

Leslie
Sharonne & Shania
Susy, Jamie & Juliet
Nori, Sharon & Chloe
Elise
Sander & Jennifer
Joey & Pernila
Valery

Junior Dance 2013 finalists

Julide & Defne
Jemuel
Elianne
Robin & Joelle
Robin, Remen & Matthew
Robbin
Kyra & Trijntje
Charlie-Ann
Gina
Mon
Johanneke
Esmee & Nadine

Dutch reality television series
Dutch-language television shows